The Canadian Coast Guard (CCG) maintains a fleet of sea and lake going vessels, hovercraft, and aircraft. The variety of equipment allows the CCG to perform its mandated functions of navaids and sea-going transportation management, search and rescue, marine pollution response and the support of other Canadian federal authorities.

Vessels
The Fleet Directorate of the Canadian Coast Guard (CCG) is responsible for all ships and their manning requirements. As of October, 2022, it manages and operates a fleet of 123 vessels in support of: CCG aids to navigation; icebreaking; environmental response; and search and rescue (SAR). The CCG fleet also supports Department of Fisheries and Oceans's Fisheries Conservation and Protection and Marine Science programs.

The ships, ranging from search and rescue lifeboats to icebreakers, are tasked to various programs, often concurrently, and are crewed by 2,400 skilled seagoing personnel. Most vessels have between 4 and 30+ crewmembers.

All CCG vessels are painted uniformly regardless of their use. They are characterized by a red hull and white superstructure, designed to look like a "floating Canadian flag". Their hulls bear a (primarily) white stripe raked forward at a 60 degree angle on each side forward. Larger vessels display a red maple leaf on the funnel. Ship nameplates are typically affixed to the superstructure, and vessels are typically named for persons or places of historic or geographic significance.

Throughout the 1960s–1990s, the CCG painted primary SAR vessels in a different colour scheme: bright mustard yellow superstructure and maple leaf red hull, meant to distinguish them from navaid tenders and icebreakers, and also to improve their visibility on the open ocean in breaking waves. Today, the only distinguishing markings for primary SAR vessels is the large RESCUE-SAUVETAGE lettering on the superstructure. Vessels carry the "Canada" 'federal wordmark', which incorporates the duotone version of the national flag. The words Coast Guard/Garde Cotière appear side by side on the hull.

The prefix "Canadian Coast Guard Ship", abbreviated CCGS, is affixed to all vessels.  Minor vessels such as patrol boats and lifeboats carried the prefix "Canadian Coast Guard Cutter", abbreviated CCGC in the past, however, this is no longer the case.

The list of various classes of CCG vessels includes:

Icebreakers

Polar icebreaker
Has a large cargo carrying capacity, a helicopter hangar that will accommodate two CCG helicopters, and carry multiple utility craft. Has the capacity to over-winter in the Arctic, and the capacity to deliver a large suite of Government of Canada programs. Named after former Canadian prime ministers.

Heavy icebreaker
Has a large cargo carrying capacity, a helicopter hangar that will accommodate a CCG helicopter, and carry multiple utility craft. Named after a former Canadian prime minister and the late cancer research activist Terry Fox. Formerly referred to as Type 1300.

Medium icebreaker
Has a cargo carrying capacity and carry multiple utility craft. Some may incorporate a helicopter hangar to accommodate a CCG helicopter. Has the capability to deliver many Government of Canada programs such as many CCG programs and scientific missions. Formerly referred to as Type 1200.

Multi-tasked

High endurance multi-tasked vessel
Has a shallower draught than the medium icebreaker and is less capable overall. Has a crane, a large cargo hold and deck capacity, has a helicopter hangar that will accommodate a CCG helicopter, can launch and recover rigid-hulled inflatable boats and two utility craft. Has the capability to deliver many Government of Canada programs. Formerly referred to as Type 1100.

Medium endurance multi-tasked vessel
Has a crane, a large cargo hold and deck area, can launch and recover rigid-hull inflatable boats and utility craft. Primarily used for aids to navigation, search and rescue, science and environmental response and has some icebreaking capability. Designed to have a helicopter deck but not generally equipped with one. Named after former Canadian mariners or members of the CCG who have made a significant contribution. Formerly referred to as Type 1050 and 1000.

Science vessels

Offshore oceanographic science vessel
Equipped with wet labs and has bottom sampling and water column sampling capability, can accommodate a helicopter with minimal hangar capabilities and can launch and recover utility craft. Primarily used for ecosystem and fishery science, oceanographic missions and geological and hydrographic surveys. Named after former Canadian scientists or explorers who have made a significant contribution.
 
 One unnamed vessel to replace former  to be built by Seaspan ULC and service entry planned for 2025.

Offshore fishery science vessel
Equipped with wet labs and able to do trawl surveys and has some water column sampling capability, no helicopter capabilities. Primarily used for ecosystem and fishery science research. Named after former  scientists or explorers who have made a significant contribution.

Mid-shore science vessel
No helicopter capability and limited capacity to carry survey launches. Primarily used for limited ecosystem fishery science, oceanographic missions and geological/hydrographic surveys. Named after former Dominion hydrographers of Canada or former explorers of Canada.

Near-shore fishery research vessel
Has minimal ice capability to transit light ice-infested waters. Has some lab capacity and has no helicopter capability. Used to conduct trawl surveys. Named after former Canadians who have made a contribution to marine and fishery research or fisheries management.
 CCGS Leim
 CCGS M. Perley
 CCGS Neocaligus
 CCGS Vladykov

Patrol vessels

Offshore patrol vessel
Can operate year-round in Canadian waters, except the Arctic archipelago, and has a minimal ice capability to transit light ice-infested waters. Designed to support law enforcement, and has a program operations room. Primarily used for fisheries enforcement and search and rescue. Named after Former Companions of the Order of Canada.
 
 
 
 
 
 
 Future Multi-purpose vessels (~latter 2020s/2030s)
 Two Future Arctic Offshore Patrol Ships (~latter-2020s)

Mid-shore patrol vessel

No requirement for operations in ice-infested waters. Carries one or two rigid-hull inflatable boats with no helicopter capabilities. Primarily used for maritime security and fisheries enforcement. Named after former winners of the Victoria Cross, Star of Military Valour, Medal of Military Valour, Meritorious Service Medal, Star of Courage, Medal of Bravery, Order of Merit of the Police Forces, Royal Canadian Mounted Police Role of Honour of Department of Fisheries and Oceans or CCG members who died in the line of duty.

Other

Special navaids vessel
Can accommodate a helicopter with minimal hangar capabilities. Primarily used for navigational aids on the Mackenzie River. Named with Aboriginal words.

Channel survey and sounding vessel
Carries a small utility craft and has no helicopter capability. Primarily used to conduct depth survey operations. Named after former Dominion hydrographers of Canada or former explorers of Canada.
Has no helicopter capability. Primarily used for search and rescue, aids to navigation, environmental response and icebreaking. Named with Aboriginal words. 
 
 
 

No helicopter capability. Named after geographical features uniform by class. Canadian capes for high speed lifeboats ( MLBs). Canadian bays for high endurance lifeboats (/ design). CCG maintains 36  s, those listed with the name prefix Cape (or Cap in french). The exception is CCGS Cap Aux Mueles which is one of ten larger motor lifeboats based on Arun-class lifeboats designed in the United Kingdom. The CCG is in the process of building replacements for the Arun type lifeboats based on the Severn type lifeboat also designed in the United Kingdom. The first Bay-class lifeboats were delivered in late 2017

Arun class
 
 
 
 
 
 
 
 
 
 

Bay class
 
 
 CCGS Pachena Bay CCGS McIntyre Bay CCGS Sacred Bay CCGS Conception BayCCGS Cadboro BayCCGS Florencia BayCape class
 
 
 
 
 
 
 
 
 
 
 
 
 
 
 
 
 
 
 
 
 
 
 
 
 
 
 
 
 
 
 
 
 
 
 
 

Specialty vesselSmall, under , shallow-draft vessel of various designs with no ice capability. Generally has no accommodation with a crew complement that is specific to tasks the vessel performs. No helicopter capability. Used for marine and fishery research, conservation and protection patrols, science and aids to navigation. Named after Former Canadians who have made a contribution to marine and fishery research or fisheries management or maritime safety or security or marine transportation. 
  - small buoy tender
  - small buoy tender
 
 
  - small buoy tender
 
 
 
 
 
  - river buoy tender
 
 
 

Training vesselsVessels used for training at the Coast Guard College.
  (retired)

Large vessels carry work boats such as Rotork Marine's Sea Truck design, similar to small landing craft, which are deployed by davits and used for delivering supplies ashore to light stations and remote communities. Rigid-hulled inflatable boats equipped with outboard or inboard engine propulsion systems are deployed aboard CCG ships or at shore stations as tenders and as fast rescue craft (FRC) for utility and search and rescue tasks. These vessels are not named. Work boats
 Roseborough Boats RF-246 designs
 Rotork Marine Sea Truck designs
 Rigid hull inflatable boats (RHIBs)
 Zodiac Hurricane Mark IV, Mark V, Mark VI, 733 and 753 SOLAS designs
 Roseborough Boats Rough Water 9.11 SOLAS designs

Retired vessels

The following is a listing of vessels that are no longer part of the Canadian Coast Guard's present fleet.
 
 
 
 
  – July 2016 – transferred to Parks Canada – now named 
 
  – retired
  – retired
 
  - previously known as Polar Gas II - believed to have been sold at auction
  – decommissioned
  - Icebreaker, lighthouse supply and buoy vessel decommissioned 1985, scrapped 1989
  – now retired and re-commissioned by Toronto Fire Services as fireboat William Thornton in 2015
 
 
  - decommissioned 2012
  - decommissioned 1978 and museum ship since 1980
  - scrapped in 2020
 
 
 
 
 
 
 
 
 
 
  - sold and now MV Leeway Odyssey
 
  - delivered in 1983 for SFO and retired 2000; built as Beau Bois 
  - ex-Lurcher No.5 lightship, training ship at the Canadian Coast Guard College in the 1970s
 
 
 
 
 
 
 
 
  - decommissioned 2001; scrapped 2011
 
 
 
 
 
 
 
 
 
 
 
 
 
 
 
 
 
 
 
 
 
 
  - retired 2005 and re-commissioned by Toronto Fire as fireboat Sora; retired in 2015
 
 
 
 
 
 
 
  
 
 
 
  - survey ship sold and renamed Heavenbound 1984; renamed again as Still Watch 1995
 
 
 
 

Aircraft
In addition to various bases located in deep water ports, rescue stations in smaller minor ports, and eighteen ships equipped with aviation facilities like flight decks and/or hangars the CCG operates 23 helicopters. There are also eight fixed wing aircraft operated on CCG's behalf by Transport Canada. Rotary wing aircraft are used as ice reconnaissance platforms in the winter (operating from icebreakers and shore bases), while flying maintenance personnel and supplies for servicing aids to navigation year-round. Fixed wing aircraft are flown in support of the Canadian Ice Service and also conduct arctic sovereignty patrols, marine pollution surveillance and fisheries protection patrols as part of the Canadian government's National Aerial Surveillance Program.

As part of the Coast Guard's Fleet Renewal Plan, the Government of Canada has purchased and deployed 23 new helicopters – 16 light-lift helicopters (Bell 429) and seven medium-lift helicopters (Bell 412EPI).

In December 2013, the Minister of National Defence (the lead Minister for Search and Rescue) released the first "Quadrennial SAR Review" in order to provide a comprehensive perspective of Canada's National SAR Program (NSP). In the SAR resources section of the review it states "The Canadian Coast Guard has a total of 117 vessels and 22 helicopters stationed across the country that can deliver maritime SAR services, either in a primary or secondary role".

Rotary-wing deployment

Atlantic Region
 Seven Bell 429s are operated in: Stephenville, Newfoundland and Labrador (1), St. John's, Newfoundland and Labrador (2), Charlottetown, Prince Edward Island (1), Halifax, Nova Scotia (2) and Saint John, New Brunswick (1).
 Three Bell 412s are operated in Halifax (2) and St John's, Newfoundland (1).

 Central/Arctic Region 

 Four Bell 429s operate in Quebec City, Quebec; 1 operates in Parry Sound, Ontario
 Two Bell 412s are operated in Quebec City (1) and Parry Sound (1).

Western Region

 Three Bell 429s operate in Victoria, British Columbia 
 Two Bell 412s operate from the Seal Cove Base in Prince Rupert, British Columbia. They replaced the two Bell 212s, that operated from Seal Cove Base, in 2017.

Fixed-wing deployment

One fixed wing aircraft (owned and operated by Transport Canada on behalf of CCG) is based in eastern Canadian airports with the facility at Ottawa International Airport providing the main maintenance base. A single fixed wing aircraft is based in British Columbia. The CCG operates two Transport Canada aircraft under contract: an Ottawa-based de Havilland Dash 8, which does pollution control patrols over the Great Lakes, St. Lawrence Seaway, and parts of the east coast; and a Vancouver-based de Havilland Twin Otter, which flies fisheries and pollution control missions along the west coast. In addition to the federal government aircraft, a private company Provincial Aerospace Ltd., is contracted to operate four specially modified and equipped King Air 200 aircraft in support of the National Aerial Surveillance Program (jointly funded by Transport Canada and Fisheries and Oceans Canada), from Halifax, St. John's and Comox, British Columbia.

 Bases 
All CCG regions operate helicopters. However, ice reconnaissance missions are primarily flown in eastern Canada, given the absence of ice surveillance requirements for the West Coast. Unlike fixed-wing aircraft, helicopters can often operate directly out of CCG bases, as is the case in Quebec City and Parry Sound. The majority of CCG aircraft operate from municipal airports located near major CCG bases, as follows:

 Fixed and rotary-wing maintenance
 Ottawa Macdonald–Cartier International Airport (YOW), Ottawa, Ontario

 Fixed wing operations and maintenance
 Vancouver International Airport (YVR), Richmond, British Columbia
 Greater Moncton International Airport (YQM), Dieppe, New Brunswick
 Iqaluit Airport (YFB), Iqaluit, Nunavut
 Halifax Stanfield International Airport (YHZ), Halifax
 St. John's International Airport (YYT), St. John's

 Rotary-wing operations and maintenance
 Stephenville International Airport (YJT), Stephenville
 St. John's International Airport (YYT), St. John's
 12 Wing Shearwater (YAW), Halifax
 Saint John Airport (YSJ), Saint John
 Charlottetown Airport (YYG), Charlottetown
 Canadian Coast Guard Base Parry Sound, Parry Sound
 Victoria International Airport (YYJ) and Shoal Point, Sidney, British Columbia
 Prince Rupert Airport (YPR) and CCG Base Seal Cove, Prince Rupert, British Columbia

CCG's fixed-wing operations and maintenance bases are co-located with Transport Canada aviation operations facilities. Maintenance for all CCG aircraft is provided by both CCG and Transport Canada personnel.

 Air search and rescue 
All Canadian Coast Guard aircraft are able assist the Canadian Forces with search and rescue operations, as well as having a secondary air search and rescue role in the CCG.

 Canadian Coast Guard Auxiliary 
The Canadian Coast Guard Auxiliary (CCGA) does not operate an aviation branch. This role is instead provided by the volunteer Civil Air Search and Rescue Association (CASARA). Some CCGA volunteers also volunteer with CASARA or have cross-trained with the Royal Canadian Air Force (RCAF).

Retired aircraft

CCG has operated the following aircraft types which have since been retired:

 Bell 47
 Bell 206 JetRanger A/B and LongRanger L variants
 Bell 212 Twin Two Twelve
 Douglas C-47 Skytrain - operated by Transport Canada
 Cessna Super Skymaster
 Grumman S-2 Tracker
 Aérospatiale Alouette III
 Sikorsky S-61
 MBB Bo 105S

 Procurement 
Many larger vessels in the CCG are close to the end of their planned lifetime, having been constructed from the 1960s–1980s with no replacements in the 1990s–2000s. To replace them, new icebreakers, multi-purpose vessels, patrol ships and science vessels are to be constructed under terms of the National Shipbuilding Procurement Strategy; now known as the National Shipbuilding Strategy (NSS). Under the NSS and since Budget 2006, the following projects have been initiated:

Mid Shore Patrol Vessel Project

The Mid Shore Patrol Vessel Project procured nine vessels to supplement fisheries conservation and protection duties as well as marine security duties in the Maritime, Newfoundland, Pacific, and Central and Arctic regions. It was expected that four of these vessels are to be tasked with marine security duties in Central and Arctic Region and will have an operating area in the Great Lakes – St. Lawrence Seaway. The initial procurement process for 12 ships was cancelled in 2008 when bids came in over budget; however, a revised bidding process was reissued in 2009. On September 2, 2009, Public Works and Government Services Canada awarded a contract to Halifax Shipyards to build nine (down from the original twelve) mid-shore patrol vessels based on a 'Canadianized' version of the Damen Stan 4207 patrol vessel. All vessels had been delivered to the Coast Guard by the end of 2014.

Offshore Fisheries Science Vessel Project

Two vessels were provided for in Budget 2006, with funding for an additional vessel added in Budget 2007. The procurement process for these vessels began in September 2009, and actual construction work on the three vessels in the class started in June 2015 at Seaspan ULC's Vancouver Shipyards. They were originally projected to start entering service in 2017. However, the first vessel of the class, was delivered in June 2019 followed by the second ship, CCGS Capt. Jacques Cartier, in December 2019. In October 2020, the third and final ship of the class, CCGS John Cabot, was handed over to the Coast Guard completing the project. She will be home ported in St. John's, Newfoundland.

 Offshore Oceanographic Science Vessel Project 

The Offshore Oceanographic Science Vessel Project is a plan to procure a single vessel that will be  in length capable of carrying 30 crew as well as 37 scientists. The ship will replace  which was Canada's major oceanographic research vessel for 40 years but suffered a "catastrophic motor failure" in 2021 ending her service. Funds for the project were initially allocated in Budget 2007. The first phase of the procurement process for this vessel, along with the three offshore fisheries science vessels, was launched in September 2009 when the government issued a Solicitation of Interest and Qualification to identify qualified designers. Although construction was originally scheduled to proceed immediately following the Offshore Fisheries Science Vessel project, construction of this vessel is now taking place between the construction of the two Protecteur-class Joint Support Ships at the Seaspan Yard. In February 2021, a $453.8 million contract was awarded to Seaspan yards to begin construction on the vessel. The full costs, however, were reported to be nearly $1 billion, a figure attracting considerable criticism. The first steel was cut on the new ship in March 2021 with an envisaged completion date of 2024. However, that in-service date subsequently slipped to 2025. In November 2022, it was reported that the ship's keel had been formally laid down.

Polar Class Icebreaker Project

The February 2008 federal budget designated $720 million for the Polar Class Icebreaker Project to replace  in FY 2017. This vessel was originally scheduled to start construction at the Seaspan ULC yard in Vancouver in sequence after two new  Joint Support Ships (JSS) were built for the Royal Canadian Navy. However, ongoing delays with the JSS and other projects resulted in the reallocation of this vessel to another yard in 2019 with an uncertain build timeframe. In February 2020, the federal government requested that all interested Canadian shipyards to outline their capacity to potentially construct John G. Diefenbaker with the objective of securing service entry by December 2029. In May 2021, the Government announced that two polar-class icebreakers would be built instead, one at Seaspan and the other at Davie (pending the successful conclusion of the umbrella agreement with Davie which was then envisaged by the end of 2021 though at the end of the year progress had not yet been reported). The service entry for the first of these two icebreakers was now projected as being in 2030. In 2021, the Parliamentary Budget Officer estimated the cost of building two vessels at $7.25 billion.

 Inshore Fisheries Science Vessel Project 

The 2009 federal budget announced $175 million in funding for, among other things an Inshore Fisheries Science Vessel Project which will procure three new Inshore Fisheries Science Vessels. Two  vessels are to be based in Quebec region, while a third  vessel will be based in Maritime region (in New Brunswick). In June 2009, the government awarded a contract to Robert Allan Ltd. of Vancouver, British Columbia to design the vessels. The vessels are CCGS Vladykov, CCGS M. Perley and CCGS Leim. In June 2012, the first vessel, CCGS Vladykov, which had been built at Meridien Maritime in Matane, Quebec, arrived at its homeport of St. John's, Newfoundland and Labrador. CCGS M. Perley and CCGS Leim also entered service in 2012. M. Perley is homeported at Dartmouth, Nova Scotia, while Leim is homeported at Sorel-Tracy, Quebec.

Medium icebreakers

In 2019, the federal government indicated that a third shipyard would be added to the National Shipbuilding Strategy and that the construction of six medium icebreakers, to replace the Coast Guard's existing and aging icebreaker fleet, would be undertaken. A competition was undertaken to select the third yard with the envisaged construction of the icebreakers to proceed starting in the 2020s. In December 2019, it was announced that only the Davie Shipyard had qualified to build the envisaged icebreakers for the CCG. An umbrella agreement was planned to be negotiated between Davie and the Government of Canada by the end of 2020. However, by the end of 2020 no progress had yet been reported. The build and completion schedule is currently unknown, though the Coast Guard's existing icebreaker fleet is aging rapidly with all vessels expected to reach their estimated life expectancies in the 2020s. In May 2021 the Government announced that the envisaged umbrella agreement with Davie was now anticipated at the end of 2021, one year later than originally planned. As of the end of 2021, further progress on the conclusion of the umbrella agreement had not yet been reported. In June 2022 the Government again indicated that negotiations had been initiated to conclude an agreement by the end of the year. However, as of early January 2023 and consistent with the pattern of previous years, no further progress had been reported.

Multi-purpose vessels

Up to 16 Multi Purpose Vessels are now scheduled to be built at the Seaspan yard after the second of the two Joint Support Ships are completed. This project is a new addition to the National Shipbuilding Strategy which is designed to provide greater stability to the build program at Seaspan. The Multi Purpose Vessels will supersede originally envisaged Offshore Patrol Vessels and Multi-Role High-Endurance Vessels (with a similar role) that originally had been planned to be built in two blocks of up to five ships each. Instead up to 16 new vessels (numbers being partially budget dependent) will be built which are envisaged as performing multiple roles for the Coast Guard by replacing several existing Coast Guard fleets. Construction work on this project is scheduled to begin at the Seaspan yard in the mid-2020s as work on the second of the two Joint Support Ships winds down.

Arctic Offshore Patrol Ships

Two Arctic Offshore Patrol Ships (AOPS) are planned for the Coast Guard utilizing the same design as the vessels currently being constructed for the Royal Canadian Navy (RCN). As of 2020, construction of these Coast Guard variants of the AOPS design was scheduled to begin at the Irving Yard in Halifax in 2022 and 2023, coming at the tail end of AOPS production for the RCN. In 2022 it was reported that the two vessels were expected to be delivered in 2026 and 2027 respectively and that the cost would be significantly greater than originally anticipated, totalling about $1.5 billion for two ships.  In January 2023, it was announced that the vessels had been ordered and that work on them would begin in the course of 2023. In early 2023, it was also reported that the projected costs for the two Coast Guard ships had increased by an additional $100 million.

 Miscellaneous vessels and repair of existing vessels 
The funding announced in Budget 2009 also provided for the procurement of 98 small boats and barges for the CCG, as well as the life extension or repair of 40 of its larger vessels.

 Light and medium-lift helicopters 
On August 20, 2012, the Government of Canada announced a procurement of 24 new helicopters to replace the existing fleet with delivery in 2017. Of these helicopters, two could eventually be assigned to the new Polar-class icebreakers if and when those vessels enter service.  The Canadian Government announced it will buy 15 Bell 429 helicopters to satisfy the requirement for light helicopters.  The contracts for both the light helicopters and the medium-lift helicopters were signed in 2014–2015, with the seven Bell 412 EPI ordered to fulfill the medium-lift helicopter role in April 2015. Deliveries of the Bell 429 began in March 2015 and all aircraft were delivered by March 2016. Delivery of the Bell 412 EPI was completed in March 2017.

Second-hand vessels

The CCG acquired the Romanian-built commercial tug icebreaker Mangystau-2 in November 2021 from New Brunswick based Atlantic Towing. The ship traveled from the Caspian Sea in Turkmenistan to CCG Base Prescott where it was converted into a light icebreaker by 2022.  In October 2022, it was reported that the ship will be named CCGS Judy LaMarsh'', and be ready for the 2022–2023 icebreaking season.

See also
 List of Canadian Coast Guard Bases and Stations
 List of Canadian Coast Guard MCTS Centres
 List of equipment of the United States Coast Guard

References

Citations

Sources

External links
 
 
 

Equip
.
Canadian Coast Guard Equipment
Canadian Coast Guard
Canadian Coast Guard